Blackwolf Run is a golf course complex in Kohler, Wisconsin. It is one of two golf destinations associated with The American Club, owned by a subsidiary of the Kohler Company. The other is the Whistling Straits complex in nearby Haven.

Opened in 1988 with 18 holes, Blackwolf Run was named that year's "Best New Public Course" by Golf Digest magazine, and has continued to accumulate awards and honors including regular ranking on the list of "America's 100 Greatest Golf Courses" by Golf Digest and the "Top 100 You Can Play" by Golf Magazine. Nine holes were added in 1989 and it became a 36-hole facility in 1990. Most recently, both the River and Meadow Valleys courses received the coveted 5-Star ranking from Golf Digest.

River Course
The course has a rating of 76.2, and it has a slope rating of 151. Designed by noted course architect Pete Dye, the course uses half of the original holes opened in 1988 and is played on bent grass. The river is the meandering Sheboygan River, which flows eastward to Lake Michigan at Sheboygan.

Meadow Valleys Course
Also designed by Dye, the course rating is 75.1, with a slope of 145.

U.S. Women's Open
The Original Championship Course (holes 10-18 on the Meadow Valleys Course and holes 1-4 and 14-18 on the River Course) was used for the 1998 U.S. Women's Open, won by Se Ri Pak in an extended playoff. The composite course uses the original 18 holes at Blackwolf Run, which were split between the two courses when the second 18 holes were added.

Scorecards

References

External links
 
 

Golf clubs and courses in Wisconsin
Buildings and structures in Sheboygan County, Wisconsin
Golf clubs and courses designed by Pete Dye
Tourist attractions in Sheboygan County, Wisconsin
Kohler Company